Xylophis stenorhynchus (Günther's mountain snake) is a species of snake found in the Western Ghats of India.

The status of Xylophis indicus as a junior synonym of X. stenorhynchus is tentative as it is only known from one specimen collected more than a century ago. However, there is a tentative recent sighting from the Meghamalai Wildlife Sanctuary.

References

Further reading
 Beddome, R.H. 1878 Proc. Zool. Soc. London 1878: 576
 Günther, A. 1875 Second report on collections of Indian Reptiles obtained by the British Museum. Proc. Zool. Soc. London,1875: 224–234.

Pareidae
Snakes of Asia
Reptiles of India
Endemic fauna of the Western Ghats
Reptiles described in 1875
Taxa named by Albert Günther